Christiane Soeder (born 15 January 1975 in Remscheid, North Rhine-Westphalia) is a German-born Austrian road racing cyclist and former duathlete who now lives in Vienna. She won the Austrian National Road Race Championships in 2004, 2006 and 2009. She finished fourth in the 2008 Olympic road race with a time of 3h 32′ 28.

Palmarès

2002
GP Schwarzwald

2003 
National Road Championships (German)
2nd Road Race
2nd Time Trial

2004 
National Road Championships
1st  Road Race
1st  Time Trial
1st Stage 3 Tour de Krasna Lipa
3rd Luk Challenge

2005 
National Road Championships
1st  Time Trial
2nd Road Race
2nd Souvenir Magali Pache
3rd Overall Tour Cycliste Féminin de la Drôme
1st Prologue & Stage 3a (TTT)
3rd Overall Grande Boucle Féminine Internationale
1st Stage 2

2006 
National Road Championships
1st  Road Race
1st  Time Trial
1st The Ladies Golden Hour
1st Stage 1 Geelong Tour
1st Prologue Thüringen-Rundfahrt der Frauen
2nd Tour of Flanders for Women
2nd Chrono Champenois - Trophée Européen

2007 
National Road Championships
1st  Time Trial
1st  Criterium
5th Road Race
1st Ybbs Chrono
1st Prologue Tour de l'Aude Cycliste Féminin
1st Stage 5a Thüringen-Rundfahrt der Frauen
2nd Souvenir Magali Pache
3rd Sparkassen Giro Bochum
3rd Time Trial, UCI Road World Championships

2008 
National Road Championships
1st  Time Trial
1st  Criterium
1st  Overall Grande Boucle Féminine Internationale
1st Stage 6
1st Open de Suede Vargarda TTT
1st Souvenir Magali Pache
1st Wiesen Chrono
1st Stage 2 Tour de l'Ardèche
2nd Time Trial, UCI Road World Championships
Olympic Games
4th Road Race
7th Time Trial

2009 
National Road Championships
1st  Road Race
1st  Time Trial
1st Open de Suede Vargarda TTT
1st GP Suisse Féminin
1st Souvenir Magali Pache
1st GP Oberbaselbiet
1st Stages 1 & 2 Tour Cycliste Féminin Ardèche Sud Rhone Alpes
2nd Overall Grande Boucle Féminine Internationale
1st Stage 2
5th Time Trial, UCI Road World Championships
8th La Flèche Wallonne
9th Overall Thüringen-Rundfahrt der Frauen
1st Stage 4

2010 
1st  Hill Climb, National Road Championships

2012 
1st  Time Trial, National Road Championships

References

External links

 
 
 

1975 births
Living people
People from Remscheid
Sportspeople from Düsseldorf (region)
Austrian female cyclists
Olympic cyclists of Austria
Cyclists at the 2004 Summer Olympics
Cyclists at the 2008 Summer Olympics
Duathletes
21st-century Austrian women